Natural remanent magnetization (NRM) is the permanent magnetism of a rock or sediment. This preserves a record of the Earth's magnetic field at the time the mineral was laid down as sediment or crystallized in magma and also the tectonic movement of the rock over millions of years from its original position. Natural remanent magnetization forms the basis of paleomagnetism and magnetostratigraphy.

Types 

There are several kinds of NRM that can occur in a sample. Many samples have more than one kind superimposed. Thermoremanent magnetization (TRM) is acquired during cooling through the Curie temperature of the magnetic minerals and is the best source of information on the past Earth's field. Magnetization formed by phase change, chemical action or growth of crystals at low temperature is called chemical remanent magnetization. Sediments acquire a depositional remanent magnetization during their formation or a post-depositional remanent magnetization afterwards.

Some kinds of remanence are undesirable and must be removed before the useful remanence is measured. One is isothermal remanent magnetization (IRM), which as a component of NRM induced through exposing a particle to a large magnetic field, causing the field to flip its lower coercivity magnetic moments to a field-favored direction.  A commonly cited mechanism of IRM acquisition is through lightning strikes.  Another is viscous remanent magnetization (VRM), a remanence acquired when the rock sits in the Earth's field for long periods.

The most important component of remanence is acquired when a rock is formed. This is called its primary component or characteristic remanent magnetization (ChRM). Any later component is called a secondary component. To separate these components, the NRM is stripped away in a stepwise manner using thermal or alternating field demagnetization techniques to reveal the characteristic magnetic component. 

But not "all magnetic changes resulting from mechanical shock can be removed by AF demagnetization". Marine oil-bearing sandstones are physically unstable mineralogies whose low-field susceptibility and isothermal remanent magnetization increase irreversibly, even after weak mechanical shocks and an AF demagnetization in 100 mT peak alternating fields.

See also
Rock magnetism

Notes

References 

 

Ferromagnetism
Stratigraphy